Roman Jankowski (born 5 October 1957 in Kościan, Poland) is a speedway rider active from 1976 until 2006. He is a former Polish Champion, having won the title in 1981 and again in 1988.

Roman has also represented Poland at the World Team Cup. He rode for the Hackney Hawks in 1980 and 1981. Currently he is the youth coach and manager of Unia Leszno.

Roman's three sons, Łukasz, Marcin and Norbert are all speedway riders.

World final appearances

Individual World Championship
 1987 -  Amsterdam, Olympic Stadium - 14th - 8pts
 1988 -  Vojens, Speedway Center - 16th -2pts
 1994 -  Vojens, Speedway Center - Reserve - 0pts

World Team Cup
 1980 -  Wrocław, Olympic Stadium (with Zenon Plech / Andrzej Huszcza / Edward Jancarz / Jerzy Rembas) - 3rd - 15pt (5)
 1984 -  Leszno (with Zenon Plech / Zenon Kasprzak / Leonard Raba / Boleslaw Proch) - 4th - 8pt (1)

Notes

External links
www.hackneyhawks.co.uk

1957 births
Living people
Polish speedway riders
Polish speedway champions
Hackney Hawks riders
People from Kościan
Sportspeople from Greater Poland Voivodeship